Macrobathra antimeloda is a moth in the family Cosmopterigidae. It is found in Madagascar.

Its forewings are dark fuscous with white markings and it has a wingspan of 15 mm.

See also
List of moths of Madagascar

References

Macrobathra
Moths described in 1930